Travix International BV (in short, Travix) is a company that manages several travel websites operating in various countries. The company maintains headquarters in Amsterdam, Netherlands.

Operations
Travix manages five websites: CheapTickets, BudgetAir, Vayama, Vliegwinkel and Flugladen. The company is affiliated with SGR, ANVR, IATA and the Dutch Home Shopping Organization. Travix has offices in the Netherlands, Dubai, India, Singapore, the UK and the USA.

CheapTickets and Vliegwinkel operate in the Netherlands and Germany (note: the Travix sites CheapTickets.nl and CheapTickets.de are not related to CheapTickets.com, which is owned by Orbitz); Vayama does business in the US, Canada, the UK, Thailand, Hong Kong and Singapore; and BudgetAir has expanded from the Netherlands into Belgium, France and the UK.

History
Travix was established by a merger of CheapTickets (Beins Travel Group Ltd), Vliegwinkel, Flugladen, BudgetAir (Airtrade) and Vayama in January 2011. The oldest part of the company, Vliegwinkel.nl, was created by Airtrade in Haarlem and founded by Wim Butte and Andre Hesselink. Vliegwinkel.nl was the first online travel agency (OTA) in the Netherlands.

On October 4, 2018, international travel company BCD Group announced that it would take full ownership in Travix International BV after purchasing all outstanding shares from minority shareholder ING Corporate Investments. 

In January 2020, the Chinese Trip.com Group acquired Travix International BV.

On September 22nd, 2020, Vayama announced its shutdown.

Acquisitions

References

External links

Companies based in Amsterdam
Dutch companies established in 2011
Transport companies established in 2011
Online travel agencies
Online retailers of the Netherlands